Perumkulam  is a village in the Kollam district,  in the state of Kerala, India. It is the India's second and Kerala's first village of books. The village got this recognition on 19 June 2020.

Location 
The village is situated in Kulakkada Panchayath along Kottarakkara - Poovattoor road 6 kms away from Kottarakkara town and 3 kms away from Inchakkad on Main Central Road. The nearest railway station is Kottarakara railway station.

Demographics
 India census, Perumkulam had a population of 19074 with 9286 males and 9788 females.

See also 

 Bhilar
 Pustakanch Gaav

References 

Kollam district
Villages in Kollam district
History of Kerala (1947–present)